Daniel Powell (born 22 September 1997) is a British judoka. He won the gold medal in the Men's 73 kg at the 2022 Commonwealth Games. He is currently ranked number 2 in the -73kg category in the UK by the British Judo Association.

Early life and education
Born in Walsall, Powell is from Sutton Coldfield.

Career
At the junior level between 2015 and 2017, Powell won four bronze and two silver medals in European Cup competitions and a bronze medal at the 2017 U23 Championships in Podgorica.

In senior judo, he is a three times champion of Great Britain, winning the British Judo Championships in 2017, 2019 and 2021.

He won a silver medal at the 2021 European Judo Open Championships in Sarajevo and was selected for the 2022 Commonwealth Games, where he won gold in the Men's 73 kg, defeating Gambian Faye Njie with an ippon in the golden score period.

References

External links
 

1997 births
Living people
Commonwealth Games gold medallists for England
English male judoka
Judoka at the 2022 Commonwealth Games
Commonwealth Games medallists in judo
20th-century English people
21st-century English people
Sportspeople from Sutton Coldfield
Medallists at the 2022 Commonwealth Games